Franking is a municipality in the district Braunau am Inn in the Austrian state of Upper Austria.

Geography
Franking is situated in the western part of Upper Austria near the border to Germany and Salzburg. The towns is 457 m above sea level, the area is 10.44 km² and there are 955 inhabitants.

Villages
The villages in the municipity are (with population in brackets as at 1 Jan 2020):
Buch (30) 
Dorfibm (52) 
 Eggenham (101) 
 Eisengöring (84) 
Franking (250)  
Holzöster (218) 
Holzleithen (92) 
Neuhausen (77) 
 Oberfranking (108)

History
The name Franking comes from the Old High German name "Franko or Francho". The name was first mentioned in 1150, when a Ulricus von franchingen is named in a document. Till 1779 Franking was part of Bavaria, after the Treaty of Teschen it became part of Austria.

References

Cities and towns in Braunau am Inn District